The Glasgow Govan by-election, for the House of Commons constituency of Glasgow Govan, Scotland, was held on 10 November 1988. It was caused by the resignation of Bruce Millan as Member of Parliament for the constituency following his appointment as a European Commissioner.

The result of the election provided the first major upset of the by-elections in the 1987-92 Parliament and was seen as embarrassing for the Labour Party, with the former Labour MP Jim Sillars winning the seat for the Scottish National Party with a majority of 3,554 votes and a large swing from Labour to the SNP. However, it would soon be the Tories who were suffering losses in by-elections, although the 1987-1992 Parliament would ultimately end with a fourth consecutive Conservative victory.

Previous result and background

Bruce Millan had first been elected as MP for Govan in the 1983 general election, having previously represented Glasgow Craigton, a constituency which was abolished in that year and partly merged into the redrawn Govan.

At the previous general election Millan, a former Scottish Secretary, had easily held the seat for the Labour Party, increasing his vote share from 55% in 1983 to 64.9%. In contrast, his main rivals, the SDP and the Conservatives, had both seen their shares of the vote drop by over 7%. Meanwhile, the SNP had managed to increase their share of the vote by over 4%. While Millan had been the clear winner, less than 1,000 votes separated the SDP in second and the SNP in fourth place, a significant change from 1983 when the SNP had been over 5,000 votes behind the SDP.

Result

See also
 1889 Govan by-election
 1973 Glasgow Govan by-election
 Govan
 Elections in Scotland
 Lists of United Kingdom by-elections

References

1988 in Scotland
1980s elections in Scotland
Govan
1988 elections in the United Kingdom
November 1988 events in the United Kingdom
By-elections to the Parliament of the United Kingdom in Glasgow constituencies
Scottish National Party
1980s in Glasgow